Epidauria is a genus of snout moths. It was described by Hans Rebel in 1901.

Species
 Epidauria cantonella Shibuya, 1931
 Epidauria chionocraspis Hampson, 1918
 Epidauria fulvella (Kuznetzov, 1978)
 Epidauria strigosa Staudinger, 1879
 Epidauria subcostella Hampson, 1918
 Epidauria transversariella Zeller, 1848

References

Anerastiini
Pyralidae genera